Opegoi (also, Op-pe-o, Oppe-yoh, Oppegach, Oppegoeh, Redcaps, Up-pa-goine, Up-pa-goines, and Up-pah-goines) is a former Karok settlement in Humboldt County, California. It was located on the Klamath River opposite the mouth of Red Cap Creek, at an elevation of 341 feet (104 m).

References

Former settlements in Humboldt County, California
Former Native American populated places in California
Karuk villages
Lost Native American populated places in the United States